This is a list of organisations that are associated with the British Conservative Party. Some are official party organisations, others are organisations made up of party members which are not officially recognised by the party.

Current

 1922 Committee
 2020 group
 301 Group
 40 Group
 92 Group
 Alliance of European Conservatives and Reformists — The conservative Eurosceptic European political party that the Conservative Party was affiliated with when the United Kingdom was in the European Union. The reform of Eurorealism was offered, as opposed to total rejection of the EU (anti-EU-ism).
 Association of Conservative Clubs — An organisation associated with the Conservative Party in the United Kingdom. It represents and provides support to the largest association of political clubs in the country estimated at 1,100.
 Blue Collar Conservativism — Pressure group and parliamentary caucus
 Bow Group — Conservative think tank
 Bright Blue — Think tank and pressure group advocating for liberal conservativism
 Bruges Group — Eurosceptic think tank
 Carlton Club — Gentleman's club in London.  The original home of the Conservative Party before the creation of Conservative Central Office.
 Centre for Policy Studies — Think tank and pressure group
 Centre for Social Justice — Think tank co-founded in 2004 by Iain Duncan Smith, Tim Montgomerie, Mark Florman and Philippa Stroud.
 Connect
 Conservative Action for Electoral Reform
 Conservative Animal Welfare Foundation
 Conservative Animal Welfare Group
 Conservative Business Relations — Business wing
 Conservative Campaign Headquarters — Headquarters of the party
 Conservative Christian Fellowship — Christian wing
 Conservative Co-operative Movement
 Conservative Countryside Forum
 Conservative Disability Group
 Conservative Education Society — https://www.conservativeeducation.org.uk/
 Conservative Environment Network — "an independent forum conservatives who support conservation and decarbonisation" that includes a Parliamentary Caucus of over 130 British Conservative Party Members of Parliament and Peers.
 Conservative Europe Group
 Conservative Foreign and Commonwealth Council
 Conservative Friends of Africa
 Conservative Friends of America — an associated organisation founded in 2008 by Lichfield MP Michael Fabricant. Then Leader of the Opposition, David Cameron was made the group's president, and then Shadow Foreign Secretary William Hague was made vice-president. Patrons of the group included Michael Howard and Sir Malcolm Rifkind. In March 2009, the group expanded membership to prospective parliamentary candidates. Its primary focus is on improving United Kingdom–United States relations. The group was an informal successor to The Atlantic Bridge, which was set up in 1997 with the same purpose. The group is associated with Conservatives Abroad.
 Conservative Friends of Bangladesh
 Conservative Friends of Gibraltar — This was a lobby group within the Conservative Party opposed to any joint sovereignty of Gibraltar with Spain.
 Conservative Friends of Education - The Conservative Party’s biggest education group https://cfoe.co.uk/
 Conservative Friends of Greece
 Conservative Friends of India — Focused on India–United Kingdom relations
 Conservative Friends of International Development
 Conservative Friends of Israel — Israel–United Kingdom relations
 Conservative Friends of Pakistan — Pakistan–United Kingdom relations
 Conservative Friends of Palestine — British Palestine relations
 Conservative Friends of Poland — Poland–United Kingdom relations
 Conservative Friends of Russia — Russia–United Kingdom relations
 Conservative Friends of South Africa — South Africa–United Kingdom relations
 Conservative Friends of The Caribbean
 Conservative Friends of the Chinese — membership organization which engages with the British Chinese community and on British–Chinese relations.
 Conservative Friends of the Union — Scottish Conservatives
 Conservative Friends of Turkey — Turkey–United Kingdom relations
 Conservative Health
 Conservative History Group
 Conservative Humanist Association
 Conservative Mainstream
 Conservative Middle East Council — Middle Eastern relations
 Conservative Muslim Forum
 Conservative National Education Society
 Conservative National Property Advisory Committee
 Conservative Party Archive Trust
 Conservative Policy Forum
 Conservative Research Department
 Conservative Rural Action Group
 Conservative Technology Forum
 Conservative Trade Unionists
 Conservative Transport Group
 Conservative Way Forward
 Conservative Women's Organisation
 Conservative Workers & Trade Unionists
 Conservative Young Women
 Conservatives 4 Cities
 Conservatives Abroad — British Overseas Territories
 Conservatives Against Fox Hunting
 Conservatives at Work
 Conservatives for International Travel
 Conservatives for Liberty
 Cornerstone Group
 Countryside Alliance
 COVID Recovery Group — An informal group of Conservative MPs in the who opposed the government's decision to introduce a second period of lockdown measures for England during the COVID-19 pandemic, and who voted against the restrictions.
 Deep Blue
 European Foundation — Eurosceptic think tank
 European Research Group — Eurosceptic faction of Conservative MPs
 European Young Conservatives — A grouping of youth wings of conservative and centre-right political parties in Europe
 Foreign Affairs Forum of the Conservative Party — Foreign policy unit
 Free Enterprise Group
 Fresh Start Project
 International Democrat Union
 International Young Democrat Union
 LGBT+ Conservatives — LGBT wing of the party
 Margaret Thatcher Foundation
 No Turning Back
 Northern Ireland Conservatives — Branch in Northern Ireland
 Northern Research Group — MPs representing northern England, North Wales and the Scottish borders
 One Nation Conservatives — Parliamentary caucus made up of One-nation conservative Members of Parliament.
 Policy Exchange
 Reform (think tank)
 Renewing One Nation
 Society of Conservative Lawyers
 The Freedom Association
 The Macmillan Club of Cape Town, South Africa
 The Other Club
 ThinkNorth
 Tory Green Initiative
 Tory Reform Group
 UCUNF
 Welsh Conservatives — branch of the party in Wales
 Young Conservative Europe Group
 Young Conservative Network

Defunct
 Activate (organisation)
 The Atlantic Bridge
 Citizen Party (Bristol)
 Conservative Centre Forward
 Conservative Future
 European Democrats
 Junior Carlton Club
 Monday Club
 Municipal Reform Party
 National Liberal Party (UK, 1931)
 National Union of Conservative and Unionist Associations
No Campaign
 Primrose League
 Ulster Unionist Party
 Unionist Party (Scotland)
 Vermin Club
Young Britons' Foundation

References

Organisations
Political party factions in the United Kingdom